

27001–27100 

|-id=003
| 27003 Katoizumi ||  || Izumi Kato (born 1968) is a Japanese singer. Since her debut in 1991, she has released 15 singles, including her greatest hit, Sukini Natte Yokatta, and 12 albums. Her touching ballads, often called "healing pops", have fascinated her many fans in Japan. || 
|-id=004
| 27004 Violetaparra ||  || Violeta Parra (1917–1967), was a well-known Chilean artist and folk singer. || 
|-id=005
| 27005 Dariaguidetti ||  || Daria Guidetti (born 1978), Italian astrophysicist and science communicator, has made major research contributions to the field of extragalactic radioastronomy. She is an author and a presenter of the national TV program Cosmo, about astronomy and space exploration. || 
|-id=023
| 27023 Juuliamoreau ||  || Juulia-Gabrielle Moreau (born 1984) is a postdoctoral researcher at the University of Helsinki (Finland) whose studies include numerical modeling of asteroid collisions and shock effects in meteorites. || 
|-id=032
| 27032 Veazey ||  || Sally O. Veazey (born 1942) is a member of Lowell Observatory's Advisory Board. Sally shares her time and talent with Lowell Observatory by volunteering when needed. Sally is retired and spends her time working with the Women's Assistance League managing their thrift shop. || 
|-id=047
| 27047 Boisvert ||  || Scott Paul Boisvert (born 1993) was a finalist in the 2011 Intel Science Talent Search and was also awarded second place in the 2010 Intel International Science and Engineering Fair, for his environmental-science project. He attends the Basha High School, Chandler, Arizona, U.S. || 
|-id=048
| 27048 Jangong ||  || Jan Jiawei Gong (born 1993) was a finalist in the 2011 Intel Science Talent Search and was also awarded first place in the 2010 Intel International Science and Engineering Fair. She attends the Garden City Senior High School, Garden City, New York, U.S. || 
|-id=049
| 27049 Kraus ||  || Adam Levi Kraus (born 1980), American astronomer. He has developed a data-processing pipeline for the Moving Object and Transient Event Search System (MOTESS) survey instrument that has revealed thousands of new variable stars and transient events. His skillfully implemented algorithms have greatly speeded the examination of hundreds of gigabytes of imagery data. || 
|-id=050
| 27050 Beresheet ||  || The Beresheet spacecraft was the first Israeli-built mission to go to the Moon. Beresheet entered Lunar Orbit on April 4, 2019 but ended its mission one week later with an unsuccessful landing attempt. || 
|-id=052
| 27052 Katebush ||  || Kate Bush (born 1958) is a singer/songwriter/performance artist who has a haunting voice and presence when she performs. || 
|-id=054
| 27054 Williamgoddard ||  || William H. Goddard (born 1945) is a member of Lowell Observatory's Advisory Board. He serves on Lowell's Investment Committee and has been a long-time member and Friend of Lowell Observatory. || 
|-id=056
| 27056 Ginoloria ||  || Gino Loria (1862–1954), Italian mathematician and historian of mathematics || 
|-id=061
| 27061 Wong ||  || Curtis G. Wong (born 1955) is a member of Lowell Observatory's Advisory Board. Curtis gives his time and talent helping Lowell Observatory fulfill its mission. He supports Lowell's educational programs. || 
|-id=062
| 27062 Brookeminer ||  || Brooke Miner (born 1943) is an astrophysicist and a member of Lowell Observatory's Advisory Board sharing her time and talent. She is a member of Lowell's Technology Committee. || 
|-id=063
| 27063 Richardmontano ||  || Richard Montano (born 1995) is a Visitor Experience Lead for Lowell Observatory. He is a shift lead for the Starry Skies Shop and ticketing desks. Richard helps manage product receiving and inventory control. || 
|-id=071
| 27071 Rangwala ||  || Alydaar Rangwala (born 1993) was a finalist in the 2011 Intel Science Talent Search and was also awarded second place in the 2010 Intel International Science and Engineering Fair for his biochemistry project. He attends the Albany Academies, Albany, New York, U.S. || 
|-id=072
| 27072 Aggarwal ||  || Amol Aggarwal (born 1993) was a finalist in the 2011 Intel Science Talent Search, a science competition for high-school seniors, for his mathematical sciences project. He attends the Saratoga High School, Saratoga, California, U.S. || 
|-id=074
| 27074 Etatolia ||  || Eta Atolia (born 1993) was a finalist in the 2010 Intel Science Talent Search, a science competition for high-school seniors, for her biochemistry project. She attends the Rickards High School, Tallahassee, Florida, U.S. || 
|-id=079
| 27079 Vsetín ||  || The Czech town of Vsetín. It is located in the Valašsko (Wallachia) region of eastern Moravia. A public observatory founded there in 1950 concentrates on astronomical popularization and education, especially involving young people. || 
|-id=082
| 27082 Donaldson-Hanna ||  || Kerri Donaldson-Hanna (born 1976) is a planetary geologist and assistant professor in the Department of Physics at the University of Central Florida (Orlando, FL). She focuses on understanding the formation and evolution of airless bodies like the Moon, Mercury, Mars' moons, and asteroids. || 
|-id=083
| 27083 Alethialittle ||  || Alethia Little (born 1987) is the Multi-Cultural Outreach Facilitator at Lowell Observatory and educator/manager for the Native American Astronomy Outreach Program (NAAOP). She draws on her Navajo background to initiate and run NAAOP's book club, role models, summer and winter camps, and other innovations. || 
|-id=084
| 27084 Heidilarson ||  || Heidi Larson (born 1986) is the Telescope Support Specialist at Lowell Observatory. She plays a major role in maintaining the performance of the Navy Precision Optical Interferometer. During her time at Lowell, she has filled roles as a Telescope Operator at the Lowell Discovery Telescope as well as in the public programs engaging with visitors. || 
|-id=087
| 27087 Tillmannmohr ||  ||  (born 1940), former president of the German Meteorological Service and director of EUMETSAT until 2004. He played an important role in the ESA project which led to the Meteosat system and has been associated with EUMETSAT from when it was first conceived by European meteorologists. || 
|-id=088
| 27088 Valmez ||  || The Czech town of Valašské Meziříčí. It is located in the Valašsko (Wallachia) region of eastern Moravia and was first mentioned as a settlement in 1297. A small private observatory founded there in 1929 was precursor to a major public observatory in 1955 that is well known for its architectural beauty. || 
|-id=091
| 27091 Alisonbick ||  || Alison Dana Bick (born 1993) was a finalist in the 2010 Intel Science Talent Search, a science competition for high-school seniors, for her materials and bioengineering project. She attends the Millburn High School, Millburn, New Jersey, U.S. || 
|-id=094
| 27094 Salgari ||  || Emilio Salgari (1862–1911), Italian writer of action adventure. His works have nourished the fantasy of many generations, was born in Verona and died in Torino. The father of Sandokan and Black Corsair, he wrote 82 novels and hundreds of short stories, translated into many languages all over the world. || 
|-id=095
| 27095 Girardiwanda ||  || Girardi Wanda (born 1931) an Italian poet and journalist from Verona. She published eight collections of poems and is represented in four anthologies. As a journalist she published more than 400 articles on culture and history. She won 61 poetry contests and was honored in another 160. || 
|-id=096
| 27096 Jelenalane ||  || Jelena Lane (born 1993), Event Coordinator at Lowell Observatory, brings the outreach programs to under served groups in the community. She organizes special events that involve partnerships with local businesses and facilitates the rental of venues for science conferences and other functions. || 
|-id=098
| 27098 Bocarsly ||  || Joshua David Bocarsly (born 1992) was a finalist in the 2010 Intel Science Talent Search, a science competition for high-school seniors, for his materials science project. He attends the Lawrenceville School, Lawrenceville, New Jersey, U.S. || 
|-id=099
| 27099 Xiaoyucao ||  || Xiaoyu Cao (born 1993) was a finalist in the 2010 Intel Science Talent Search, a science competition for high-school seniors, for her chemistry project. She attends the Torrey Pines High School, San Diego, California, U.S. || 
|}

27101–27200 

|-
| 27101 Wenyucao ||  || Wenyu Cao (born 1993) was a finalist in the 2010 Intel Science Talent Search, a science competition for high-school seniors, for his mathematical-sciences project. He attends the Phillips Academy, Andover, Massachusetts, U.S. || 
|-id=102
| 27102 Emilychen ||  || Emily Li Chen (born 1993) was a finalist in the 2010 Intel Science Talent Search, a science competition for high-school seniors, for her microbiology project. She attends the Brownell-Talbot High School, Omaha, Nebraska, U.S. || 
|-id=103
| 27103 Sungwoncho ||  || Sung Won Cho (born 1992) was a finalist in the 2010 Intel Science Talent Search, a science competition for high-school seniors, for his animal-sciences project. He attends the Groton School, Groton, Massachusetts, U.S. || 
|-id=105
| 27105 Clarkben ||  || Benjamin Mathias Clark (born 1995) was a finalist in the 2010 Intel Science Talent Search, a science competition for high-school seniors, for his physics project. He attends the Penn Manor High School, Millersville, Pennsylvania, U.S. || 
|-id=106
| 27106 Jongoldman ||  || Jonathan Aaron Goldman (born 1993) was a finalist in the 2010 Intel Science Talent Search, a science competition for high-school seniors, for his behavioral- and social-sciences project. He attends the Plainview-Old Bethpage John F. Kennedy High School, Plainview, New York, U.S. || 
|-id=107
| 27107 Michelleabi ||  || Michelle Abi Hackman (born 1993) was a finalist in the 2010 Intel Science Talent Search, a science competition for high-school seniors, for her behavioral- and social-sciences project. She attends the John Miller Great Neck North High School, Great Neck, New York, U.S. || 
|-id=108
| 27108 Bryanhe ||  || Bryan Dawei He (born 1994) was a finalist in the 2010 Intel Science Talent Search, a science competition for high-school seniors, for his computer-science project. He attends the Williamsville High School East, East Amherst, New York, U.S. || 
|-id=110
| 27110 Annemaryvonne ||  || Anne Marie Yvonne Maury Van Der Donckt (born 1965), the sister of one of the uncredited ODAS-discoverers (presumably French astronomer Alain Maury). || 
|-id=114
| 27114 Lukasiewicz ||  || Jan Łukasiewicz (1878–1956), Polish mathematician and logician, inventor of "reverse Polish notation" || 
|-id=120
| 27120 Isabelhawkins ||  || Isabel Trecco Hawkins (born 1958), American astrochemist and director of the Center for Science Education at the University of California Berkeley Space Sciences Laboratory. She works on chemical abundances of the interstellar medium. She is also involved in education initiatives, including Project FIRST (Fostering Reading Through Science and Technology). || 
|-id=121
| 27121 Joardar ||  || Rounok Joardar (born 1994) was a finalist in the 2010 Intel Science Talent Search, a science competition for high-school seniors, for his materials and bioengineering project. He attends the Plano West Senior High School, Plano, Texas, U.S. || 
|-id=123
| 27123 Matthewlam ||  || Matthew Lam (born 1993) was a finalist in the 2010 Intel Science Talent Search, a science competition for high-school seniors, for his behavioral- and social-sciences project. He attends the Jericho Senior High School, Jericho, New York, U.S. || 
|-id=125
| 27125 Siyilee ||  || Si-Yi Ryan Lee (born 1992) was a finalist in the 2010 Intel Science Talent Search, a science competition for high-school seniors, for his biochemistry project. He attends the North Carolina School Of Science And Mathematics, Durham, North Carolina, U.S. || 
|-id=126
| 27126 Bonnielei ||  || Bonnie Rae Lei (born 1993) was a finalist in the 2010 Intel Science Talent Search, a science competition for high-school seniors, for her animal-sciences project. She attends the Walnut High School, Walnut, California, U.S. || 
|-id=130
| 27130 Dipaola ||  || Andrea Di Paola (born 1970), an Italian astronomer, discoverer of minor planets and staff member at the Rome Astronomical Observatory. He has the scientific and technical responsibility for the Campo Imperatore Observatory. He has been involved with instrumentation and software at the CINEOS project for near-Earth asteroid discovery at Campo Imperatore since 1996. || 
|-id=132
| 27132 Ježek ||  || Jaroslav Ježek (1906–1942), a Czech composer who conducted the orchestra Osvobozené divadlo ("Liberated Theatre"), Prague, during 1928–1938. He composed jazz and dance music, as well as chamber and orchestral music. His songs for plays written by Voskovec and Werich are famous. He died while emigrating to New York. || 
|-id=141
| 27141 Krystleleung ||  || Krystle M. Leung (born 1993) was a finalist in the 2010 Intel Science Talent Search, a science competition for high-school seniors, for her environmental-science project. She attends the Naperville Central High School, Naperville, Illinois, U.S. || 
|-id=147
| 27147 Mercedessosa ||  || Mercedes Sosa (1935–2009) was an Argentinian popular singer, also known as La Negra by her fans. She renewed South American folk music, interpreting, among others, songs from Atahualpa Yupanqui and Violetta Parra. She was a goodwill ambassador for UNESCO in South America and the Caribbean || 
|-id=150
| 27150 Annasante ||  || Anna Mazzi and Sante Colombini, parents of Italian amateur astronomer Ermes Colombini who has co-discovered this minor planet. || 
|-id=158
| 27158 Benedetti-Rossi ||  || Gustavo Benedetti-Rossi (born 1985) is a postdoctoral associate at the Paris Observatory (Meudon, France). His studies include Pluto, trans-Neptunian objects, centaurs, and studying small-body rings through stellar occultations. || 
|-id=169
| 27169 Annelabruzzo ||  || Anne LaBruzzo (born 1960) is the Deputy Director for Administration at Lowell Observatory. She manages the Observatory's business office and all of its financial matters, which include numerous federal grants and contracts as well as an operating budget that nearly tripled between 2010 and 2020. || 
|-id=172
| 27172 Brucekosaveach ||  || Bruce Kosaveach (born 1949) is a Philanthropy Manager for Lowell Observatory responsible for raising funds for astronomy research, educational activities, capital building projects, and general support. He is also a former volunteer Lowell Observatory Foundation Trustee. || 
|-id=178
| 27178 Quino ||  || Quino (or Joaquin Salvador Lavado Tejon, born 1932), known as Quino, an Argentinian cartoonist. || 
|-id=184
| 27184 Ciabattari ||  || Fabrizio Ciabattari (born 1970), an Italian amateur astronomer who has been Director of the Astronomical Observatory of Monte Agliale  for more than 10 years. He is a math teacher and brilliant popularizer of science. He has created a program to automate the telescope of the observatory, allowing the discovery of many supernovae. || 
|-id=192
| 27192 Selenali ||  || Selena Shi-Yao Li (born 1993) was a finalist in the 2010 Intel Science Talent Search, a science competition for high-school seniors, for her biochemistry project. She attends the Mira Loma High School, Sacramento, California, U.S. || 
|-id=194
| 27194 Jonathanli ||  || Jonathan F. Li (born 1993) was a finalist in the 2010 Intel Science Talent Search, a science competition for high-school seniors, for his bioinformatics and genomics project. He attends the Saint Margaret's Episcopal School, San Juan Capistrano, California, U.S. || 
|-id=197
| 27197 Andrewliu ||  || Andrew Bo Liu (born 1994) was a finalist in the 2010 Intel Science Talent Search, a science competition for high-school seniors, for his bioinformatics and genomics project. He attends the Henry M. Gunn Senior High School, Palo Alto, California, U.S. || 
|}

27201–27300 

|-id=208
| 27208 Jennyliu ||  || Jenny Jiaqi Liu (born 1993) was a finalist in the 2010 Intel Science Talent Search, a science competition for high-school seniors, for her computer-science project. She attends the Amity Regional High School, Woodbridge, Connecticut, U.S. || 
|-id=217
| 27217 Mattieharrington ||  || Mattie Harrington (born 1964) is Lowell Observatory's Executive Assistant to the Sole Trustee, the Director, and the development team. She also oversees the donor stewardship program, manages donor events, and assists with grant writing. She previously served as Science Staff Assistant. || 
|-id=224
| 27224 Telus ||  || Myriam Telus (born 1988) is a meteorite researcher and professor at the University of California Santa Cruz studying planetesimal formation and evolution. Her specialty is geochemical studies of short-lived radionuclides and fluid flow via laboratory measurements of chondritic meteorites. || 
|-id=227
| 27227 McAdam ||  || Maggie M. McAdam (born 1987) is a postdoctoral research fellow at Northern Arizona University and is an expert in hydrated asteroids. || 
|-id=233
| 27233 Mahajan ||  || Rohan Mahajan (born 1993) was a finalist in the 2010 Intel Science Talent Search, a science competition for high-school seniors, for his materials-science project. He attends the Harker School, San Jose, California, U.S. || 
|-id=236
| 27236 Millermatt ||  || Matthew Miller (born 1992) was a finalist in the 2010 Intel Science Talent Search, a science competition for high-school seniors, for his materials and bioengineering project. He attends the Western Alamance High School, Elon, North Carolina, U.S. || 
|-id=238
| 27238 Keenanmonks ||  || Keenan Monks (born 1993) was a finalist in the 2010 Intel Science Talent Search, a science competition for high-school seniors, for his mathematical-sciences project. He attends the Hazleton Area High School, Hazleton, Pennsylvania, U.S. || 
|-id=239
| 27239 O'Dorney ||  || Evan Michael O'Dorney (born 1993) was a finalist in the 2010 Intel Science Talent Search, a science competition for high-school seniors, for his mathematical-sciences project. He attends the Venture School, San Ramon, California, U.S. || 
|-id=240
| 27240 Robhall ||  || Rob Hall (born 1994) is a Visitor Experience Lead for Lowell Observatory. He is a shift lead for the Starry Skies Shop and ticketing desks. Rob helps train people and maintain our point of sale and ticketing software and also helps with reporting. || 
|-id=241
| 27241 Sunilpai ||  || Sunil Kochikar Pai (born 1993) was a finalist in the 2010 Intel Science Talent Search, a science competition for high-school seniors, for his chemistry project. He attends the Kinkaid School, Houston, Texas, U.S. || 
|-id=244
| 27244 Parthasarathy ||  || Nikhil Parthasarathy (born 1993) was a finalist in the 2010 Intel Science Talent Search, a science competition for high-school seniors, for his physics project. He attends the Harker School, San Jose, California, U.S. || 
|-id=248
| 27248 Schristensen ||  || Samantha Christensen (born 1982) is the Deputy Director for Education at Lowell Observatory. She oversees all of Lowell's outreach programs with over 100 000 visitors each year. She is also one of the leaders in the design and development of Lowell's upcoming Astronomy Discovery Center. || 
|-id=253
| 27253 Graceleanor ||  || Grace Eleanor Phillips (born 1993) was a finalist in the 2010 Intel Science Talent Search, a science competition for high-school seniors, for her plant-sciences project. She attends the Mamaroneck High School, Mamaroneck, New York, U.S. || 
|-id=254
| 27254 Shubhrosaha ||  || Shubhro Saha (born 1993) was a finalist in the 2010 Intel Science Talent Search, a science competition for high-school seniors, for his chemistry project. He attends the Choate Rosemary Hall, Wallingford, Connecticut, U.S. || 
|-id=257
| 27257 Tang-Quan ||  || David Kenneth Tang-Quan (born 1992) was a finalist in the 2010 Intel Science Talent Search, a science competition for high-school seniors, for his microbiology project. He attends the Palos Verdes Peninsula High School, Rolling Hills Estates, California, U.S. || 
|-id=258
| 27258 Chelseavoss ||  || Chelsea Sierra Voss (born 1994) was a finalist in the 2010 Intel Science Talent Search, a science competition for high-school seniors, for her bioinformatics and genomics project. She attends the Cupertino High School, Cupertino, California, U.S. || 
|-id=261
| 27261 Yushiwang ||  || Yushi Wang (born 1993) was a finalist in the 2010 Intel Science Talent Search, a science competition for high-school seniors, for his computer-science project. He attends the Sunset High School, Portland, Oregon, U.S. || 
|-id=263
| 27263 Elainezhou ||  || Elaine Zhou (born 1993) was a finalist in the 2010 Intel Science Talent Search, a science competition for high-school seniors, for her chemistry project. She attends the Lake Highland Prep School, Orlando, Florida, U.S. || 
|-id=264
| 27264 Frankclayton ||  || Frank Clayton Anderson III, mentored a finalist in the 2011 Intel Science Talent Search, a science competition for high-school seniors. He teaches at the Kinkaid School, Houston, Texas, U.S. || 
|-id=265
| 27265 Toddgonzales ||  || Todd Gonzales (born 1979) is Education Manager at Lowell Observatory. He oversees the development of many of the Observatory's educational programs, particularly those geared toward children. He previously served as Public Program Supervisor and Philanthropy Ambassador. || 
|-id=267
| 27267 Wiberg ||  || Kenneth B. Wiberg (born 1927), American chemist and the Ph.D. advisor of John V. McClusky who has discovered this minor planet. Wiberg has made many important contributions to the areas of spectroscopy, organic chemistry and computational chemistry while on the faculties of the University of Washington (1950–1962) and Yale University (since 1962). || 
|-id=269
| 27269 Albinocarbognani ||  || Albino Carbognani (born 1965) has worked extensively on astrometric and photometric observations of near-Earth, main-belt, Trojans and TNO asteroids. He currently works on fireballs and a space surveillance project about artificial satellites, spaces debris and near-Earth asteroids with optical observations from the ground. || 
|-id=270
| 27270 Guidotti ||  || Guido Guidotti (born 1946), Italian amateur astronomer and founder of the amateur astronomer association Valdinievole "A. Pieri" Src || 
|-id=276
| 27276 Davidblack ||  || David H. Black Jr., mentored a finalist in the 2011 Intel Science Talent Search, a science competition for high-school seniors. He teaches at the Groton School, Groton, Massachusetts, U.S. || 
|-id=277
| 27277 Pattybrown ||  || Patricia Brown mentored a finalist in the 2011 Intel Science Talent Search, a science competition for high-school seniors. She teaches at the Brownell-Talbot High School, Omaha, Nebraska, U.S. || 
|-id=279
| 27279 Boburan ||  || David (Bo) Buran mentored a finalist in the 2011 Intel Science Talent Search, a science competition for high-school seniors. He teaches at the Albany Academies, Albany, New York, U.S. || 
|-id=280
| 27280 Manettedavies ||  || Manette Davies mentored a finalist in the 2011 Intel Science Talent Search, a science competition for high-school seniors. She teaches at the Walnut High School, Walnut, California, U.S. || 
|-id=282
| 27282 Deborahday ||  || Deborah Day mentored a finalist in the 2011 Intel Science Talent Search (STS), a science competition for high-school seniors. She teaches at the Amity Regional High School, Woodbridge, Connecticut, U.S. || 
|-id=284
| 27284 Billdunbar ||  || Bill Dunbar mentored a finalist in the 2011 Intel Science Talent Search (STS), a science competition for high-school seniors. He teaches at the Henry M. Gunn Senior High School, Palo Alto, California, U.S. || 
|-id=286
| 27286 Adedmondson ||  || Adam Edmondson mentored a finalist in the 2011 Intel Science Talent Search, a science competition for high-school seniors. He teaches at the Hazleton Area High School, Hazleton, Pennsylvania, U.S. || 
|-id=287
| 27287 Garbarino ||  || Guido Garbarino mentored a finalist in the 2011 Intel Science Talent Search, a science competition for high-school seniors. He teaches at the Mamaroneck High School, Mamaroneck, New York, U.S. || 
|-id=288
| 27288 Paulgilmore ||  || Paul Gilmore mentored a finalist in the 2011 Intel Science Talent Search, a science competition for high-school seniors. He teaches at the Millburn High School, Millburn, New Jersey, U.S. || 
|-id=289
| 27289 Myrahalpin ||  || Myra Halpin mentored a finalist in the 2011 Intel Science Talent Search (STS), a science competition for high-school seniors. She teaches at the North Carolina School Of Science And Mathematics, Durham, North Carolina, U.S. || 
|-id=291
| 27291 Greghansen ||  || Gregory A. Hansen mentored a finalist in the 2011 Intel Science Talent Search, a science competition for high-school seniors. He teaches at the Lawrenceville School, Lawrenceville, New Jersey, U.S. || 
|-id=296
| 27296 Kathyhurd ||  || Kathy Hurd mentored a finalist in the 2011 Intel Science Talent Search (STS), a science competition for high-school seniors. She teaches at the Naperville Central High School, Naperville, Illinois, U.S. || 
|}

27301–27400 

|-
| 27301 Joeingalls ||  || Joseph Ingalls mentored a finalist in the 2011 Intel Science Talent Search, a science competition for high-school seniors. He teaches at the Saint Margaret's Episcopal School, San Juan Capistrano, California, U.S. || 
|-id=302
| 27302 Jeankobis ||  || Jean A. Kobis mentored a finalist in the 2011 Intel Science Talent Search, a science competition for high-school seniors. She teaches at the Williamsville High School East, East Amherst, New York, U.S. || 
|-id=303
| 27303 Leitner ||  || Roxanne Leitner mentored a finalist in the 2011 Intel Science Talent Search, a science competition for high-school seniors. She teaches at the Ursuline Academy Of Dallas, Dallas, Texas, U.S. || 
|-id=309
| 27309 Serenamccalla ||  || Serena McCalla mentored a finalist in the 2011 Intel Science Talent Search, a science competition for high-school seniors. She teaches at the Jericho Senior High School, Jericho, New York, U.S. || 
|-id=311
| 27311 Shannongonzales ||  || Shannon Gonzales (born 1989) is the Membership and Database Manager for Lowell Observatory. She oversees the membership program in addition to managing the Observatory's donor database system and gift processing department. She previously served as a Retail Associate and as a Development Assistant. || 
|-id=312
| 27312 Sconantgilbert ||  || Sarah Conant Gilbert (born 1989) is the Senior Creative Specialist for Lowell Observatory and has been instrumental in promoting the scientific research and public outreach of the Observatory in print and digital media, as well as defining and updating its brand identity. || 
|-id=314
| 27314 Janemcdonald ||  || Jane McDonald mentored a finalist in the 2011 Intel Science Talent Search, a science competition for high-school seniors. She teaches at the Rickards High School, Tallahassee, Florida, U.S. || 
|-id=320
| 27320 Vellinga ||  || Joseph Vellinga (born 1938), the Flight System Manager for the OSIRIS-REx asteroid sample-return mission. He was also the Systems Engineer and Program Manager for the Hubble Space Telescope Faint Object Spectrograph, the Genesis sample-return mission, and the Stardust sample-return mission. || 
|-id=323
| 27323 Julianewman ||  || Julia Newman mentored a finalist in the 2011 Intel Science Talent Search, a science competition for high-school seniors. She teaches at the Torrey Pines High School, San Diego, California, U.S. || 
|-id=326
| 27326 Jimobrien ||  || James O'Brien mentored a finalist in the 2011 Intel Science Talent Search, a science competition for high-school seniors. He teaches at the Venture School, San Ramon, California, U.S. || 
|-id=327
| 27327 Lindaplante ||  || Linda Plante mentored a finalist in the 2011 Intel Science Talent Search, a science competition for high-school seniors. She teaches at the Woodbury High School, Woodbury, Minnesota, U.S. || 
|-id=328
| 27328 Pohlonski ||  || Emily Parker Pohlonski mentored a finalist in the 2011 Intel Science Talent Search, a science competition for high-school seniors. She teaches at the Novi High School, Novi, Michigan, U.S. || 
|-id=330
| 27330 Markporter ||  || Mark Porter mentored a finalist in the 2011 Intel Science Talent Search (STS), a science competition for high-school seniors. He teaches at the Mira Loma High School, Sacramento, California, U.S. || 
|-id=332
| 27332 Happritchard ||  || Parmely Hap Pritchard mentored a finalist in the 2011 Intel Science Talent Search, a science competition for high-school seniors. He teaches at the Oregon Episcopal School, Portland, Oregon, U.S. || 
|-id=336
| 27336 Mikequinn ||  || Mike Quinn mentored a finalist in the 2011 Intel Science Talent Search (STS), a science competition for high-school seniors. He teaches at the Sunset High School, Portland, Oregon, U.S. || 
|-id=338
| 27338 Malaraghavan ||  || Mala Raghavan mentored a finalist in the 2011 Intel Science Talent Search, a science competition for high-school seniors. She teaches at the Harker School, San Jose, California, U.S. || 
|-id=341
| 27341 Fabiomuzzi ||  || Fabio Muzzi (1962–2006), an Italian amateur astronomer who graduated in astronomy from the University of Bologna, was an employee of the Italian National Institute of Social Security. As an amateur astronomer, he collaborated with the Osservatorio San Vittore measuring several positions of minor planets, principally near-earth objects. || 
|-id=342
| 27342 Joescanio ||  || Joseph M. V. Scanio mentored a finalist in the 2011 Intel Science Talent Search, a science competition for high-school seniors. He teaches at the Choate Rosemary Hall, Wallingford, Connecticut, U.S. || 
|-id=343
| 27343 Deannashea ||  || Deanna Shea mentored a finalist in the 2011 Intel Science Talent Search (STS), a science competition for high-school seniors. She teaches at the Shepton High School, Plano, Texas, U.S. || 
|-id=344
| 27344 Vesevlada ||  || Vladimír Veselý (born 1933), Czech researcher in apiculture, who was the director of the Bee Research Institute at Dol from 1970 to 1997. He has gained recognition for the spreading of the docile Carnica bee in the Czech Republic and for the control of the bee disease Varroa mite through the development of medicines and a national organization. || 
|-id=347
| 27347 Dworkin ||  || Jason Dworkin (born 1969), the Project Scientist for the OSIRIS-REx asteroid sample-return mission. He also leads the contamination control team for OSIRIS-REx. He is a distinguished astrochemist known for his work on characterizing prebiotic molecules from primitive meteorites. || 
|-id=348
| 27348 Mink ||  || Ronald Mink (born 1970), the Deputy Project Systems Engineer for the OSIRIS-REx asteroid sample-return mission. He leads the design effort and detailed planning for spacecraft proximity operations around the asteroid. He also served as an Optical Engineer for NIRSpec on the James Webb Space Telescope. || 
|-id=349
| 27349 Enos ||  || Heather Enos (born 1968), the Project Planning and Control Officer for the OSIRIS-REx asteroid sample-return mission. She was Project Manager for the TEGA instrument on the Phoenix Mars Mission, GRS on Mars Odyssey, and the ground data system for the MESSENGER XRS/GRS and LRO LEND instruments. || 
|-id=353
| 27353 Chrisspenner ||  || Chris Spenner mentored a finalist in the 2011 Intel Science Talent Search, a science competition for high-school seniors. He teaches at the Harker School, San Jose, California, U.S. || 
|-id=354
| 27354 Stiklaitis ||  || Angela Stiklaitis mentored a finalist in the 2011 Intel Science Talent Search, a science competition for high-school seniors. She teaches at the Penn Manor High School, Millersville, Pennsylvania, U.S. || 
|-id=356
| 27356 Mattstrom ||  || Matthew Strom mentored a finalist in the 2011 Intel Science Talent Search, a science competition for high-school seniors. He teaches at the Basha High School, Chandler, Arizona, U.S. || 
|-id=362
| 27362 Morganroche || 2000 EO || Morgan Roche Brady (born 1996) is the daughter of the discoverer. || 
|-id=363
| 27363 Alvanclark ||  || Alvan Clark (1804–1887), a noted American astronomer and telescope manufacturer. He is best known for the large refractor telescopes he built, culminating in the 40-inch at Yerkes Observatory, still the largest such telescope in the world. || 
|-id=365
| 27365 Henryfitz ||  || Henry Fitz (1808–1863), an amateur astronomer, early photographer and an optician best known for his high quality telescopes in an era when glass was of inferior quality. || 
|-id=368
| 27368 Raytesar ||  || Raymond Tesar mentored a finalist in the 2011 Intel Science Talent Search, a science competition for high-school seniors. He teaches at the Plainview-Old Bethpage John F. Kennedy High School, Plainview, New York, U.S. || 
|-id=372
| 27372 Ujifusa ||  || Allannah Ujifusa mentored a finalist in the 2011 Intel Science Talent Search, a science competition for high-school seniors. She teaches at the Cupertino High School, Cupertino, California, U.S. || 
|-id=373
| 27373 Davidvernon ||  || David C. Vernon mentored a finalist in the 2011 Intel Science Talent Search, a science competition for high-school seniors. He teaches at the Western Alamance High School, Elon, North Carolina, U.S. || 
|-id=374
| 27374 Yim ||  || P. J. Yim mentored a finalist in the 2011 Intel Science Talent Search, a science competition for high-school seniors. He teaches at the Saratoga High School, Saratoga, California, U.S. || 
|-id=375
| 27375 Asirvatham ||  || Roshini Shreya Asirvatham (born 1999) is a finalist in the 2011 Broadcom MASTERS, a math and science competition for middle-school students, for her behavioral and social sciences project. || 
|-id=381
| 27381 Balasingam ||  || Namrata Ramya Balasingam (born 1997) is a finalist in the 2011 Broadcom MASTERS, a math and science competition for middle-school students, for her physical sciences project. || 
|-id=382
| 27382 Justinbarber ||  || Justin Alexander Barber (born 1997) is a finalist in the 2011 Broadcom MASTERS, a math and science competition for middle-school students, for his physical sciences project. || 
|-id=383
| 27383 Braebenedict ||  || Braeden Christopher Benedict (born 1996) is a finalist in the 2011 Broadcom MASTERS, a math and science competition for middle-school students, for his physical sciences project. || 
|-id=384
| 27384 Meaganbethel ||  || Meagan Alanna Bethel (born 1997) is a finalist in the 2011 Broadcom MASTERS, a math and science competition for middle-school students, for her animal and plant sciences project. || 
|-id=385
| 27385 Andblonsky ||  || Andrew C. Blonsky (born 1999) is a finalist in the 2011 Broadcom MASTERS, a math and science competition for middle-school students, for his environmental sciences project. || 
|-id=386
| 27386 Chadcampbell ||  || Chad Robert Campbell (born 1999) is a finalist in the 2011 Broadcom MASTERS, a math and science competition for middle-school students, for his biochemistry, medicine, health science and microbiology project. || 
|-id=387
| 27387 Chhabra ||  || Chad Robert Campbell (born 1999) is a finalist in the 2011 Broadcom MASTERS, a math and science competition for middle-school students, for his biochemistry, medicine, health science and microbiology project. || 
|-id=390
| 27390 Kyledavis ||  || Kyle McKay Davis (born 1997) is a finalist in the 2011 Broadcom MASTERS, a math and science competition for middle-school students, for his animal and plant sciences project. || 
|-id=392
| 27392 Valerieding ||  || Valerie S. Ding (born 1997) is a finalist in the 2011 Broadcom MASTERS, a math and science competition for middle-school students, for her physical sciences project. || 
|-id=396
| 27396 Shuji ||  || Shuji Nakamura, Japanese-American electronics engineer, inventor of the blue LED and the violet-blue laser || 
|-id=397
| 27397 D'Souza ||  || Alicia Danielle D´Souza (born 1997) is a finalist in the 2011 Broadcom MASTERS, a math and science competition for middle-school students, for her environmental sciences project. || 
|-id=399
| 27399 Gehring ||  || Jeff Gehring (born 1980) is Lowell Observatory's Technical Facilities Manager, a position he has held since 2019. Prior to that, he was a Machinist and Instrument Maker. He is a vital member of the team that maintains a variety of research and outreach telescopes across multiple different sites. || 
|-id=400
| 27400 Mikewong ||  || Mike Wong (born 1971) is a planetary scientist at the University of California at Berkeley who studies giant planets in the Solar System. He is part of the team that discovered a moon around asteroid (624) Hektor, and he studied a 2009 impact on Jupiter while monitoring of the atmosphere with adaptive optics. || 
|}

27401–27500 

|-id=405
| 27405 Danielfeeny ||  || Daniel Jorgen Feeny (born 1996) is a finalist in the 2011 Broadcom MASTERS, a math and science competition for middle-school students, for his environmental sciences project. || 
|-id=407
| 27407 Haodo ||  || Scott Hao Do (born 1981) is Lowell Observatory's IT Systems Support Specialist. He maintains vital infrastructure for more than 100 staff, from scientists to engineers to educators. He also ensures smooth functioning of the computing resources required to operate the Observatory's numerous telescopes. || 
|-id=408
| 27408 Kellyferguson ||  || Kelly Ferguson (born 1991) is the Education Coordinator for Lowell Observatory. She is responsible for making science and math accessible for the youngest scientists that pass through the Observatory's doors and is the leader of summer and preschool programs on and off the Lowell campus. || 
|-id=409
| 27409 Addiedove ||  || Adrienne Dove (born 1984) is an Assistant Professor of Physics at the University of Central Florida (Orlando, Florida) whose studies include the cohesive behavior of materials in microgravity, cubesat experiments, and the electrostatic charging properties of Lunar and asteroid regoliths. || 
|-id=410
| 27410 Grimmett ||  || Maria Elena Grimmett (born 1998) is a finalist in the 2011 Broadcom MASTERS, a math and science competition for middle-school students, for her environmental sciences project. || 
|-id=411
| 27411 Laurenhall ||  || Lauren Monet Hall (born 1998) is a finalist in the 2011 Broadcom MASTERS, a math and science competition for middle-school students, for her earth and space sciences project. || 
|-id=412
| 27412 Teague ||  || Thomas Teague (born 1954) is a barrister in London and a well known amateur astronomer in the UK. His major fields of study are solar and double star measurement from his home in Chester. || 
|-id=413
| 27413 Ambruster ||  || Carol Ambruster (1943–2013) did pioneering research on magnetic activity and flares of cool stars. She led Chaco Canyon work providing evidence for an early Navajo sun-watching tradition. Carol was the epitome of a perspicuous observer, with consummate interests also in music, art and history, and the natural world (Src). || 
|-id=417
| 27417 Jessjohnson ||  || Jess Johnson (born 1966) is an observer as well as instrumentation specialist with the Catalina Sky Survey. || 
|-id=420
| 27420 Shontobegay ||  || Shonto Begay (born 1954) is a Navajo artist who lives in Flagstaff, Arizona. He is known for his visual art and writing and illustrating children's books. || 
|-id=421
| 27421 Nathanhan ||  || Nathan Han (born 1999) is a finalist in the 2011 Broadcom MASTERS, a math and science competition for middle-school students, for his biochemistry, medicine, health science and microbiology project. || 
|-id=422
| 27422 Robheckman ||  || Robert Tanner Heckman (born 1997) is a finalist in the 2011 Broadcom MASTERS, a math and science competition for middle-school students, for his biochemistry, medicine, health science and microbiology project. || 
|-id=423
| 27423 Dennisbowers ||  || Dennis Bowers (born 1953), a long-time technician of the University of Arizona's Lunar and Planetary Laboratory, where he provided electronic engineering for spacecraft and ground-based observing instrumentation and up-to-date audio-visual support for classes, conferences, and meetings. || 
|-id=425
| 27425 Bakker ||  || Robert T. Bakker (born 1945), an American paleontologist. He was instrumental in developing modern theories about dinosaurs and the warm-blooded behavior of some types of dinosaurs. His book The Dinosaur Heresies (1986) brought these new ideas to the public and lay scientists, and he was a consultant for the movie "Jurassic Park". || 
|-id=426
| 27426 Brettlawrie ||  || Brett Lawrie (born 1959), an engineer at the University of Arizona's Lunar and Planetary Laboratory and Steward Observatory. He is instrumental in the design, fabrication and testing of instruments and hardware for large world-class ground-based observatories, analytical laboratories and numerous NASA spacecraft missions. || 
|-id=431
| 27431 Jimcole ||  || Jim Cole (born 1951) is a Senior Public Program Educator at Lowell Observatory. He began by giving campus tours and operating telescopes for the public. He now serves as a telescope technician and was a major contributor to the design and implementation of the Giovale Open Deck Observatory. || 
|-id=432
| 27432 Kevinconley ||  || Kevin Conley (born 1990) is a Public Program Supervisor at Lowell Observatory. He facilitates experiences for guests by leading tours of the historic campus, operating telescopes, teaching the public about astronomy, designing and implementing new programming, and training new educators. || 
|-id=433
| 27433 Hylak ||  || Benjamin Lourdes Hylak (born 1997) is a finalist in the 2011 Broadcom MASTERS, a math and science competition for middle-school students, for his engineering project. || 
|-id=434
| 27434 Anirudhjain ||  || Anirudh Jain (born 1997) is a finalist in the 2011 Broadcom MASTERS, a math and science competition for middle-school students, for his engineering project. || 
|-id=438
| 27438 Carolynjons ||  || Carolyn Kay Jons (born 1998) is a finalist in the 2011 Broadcom MASTERS, a math and science competition for middle-school students, for her physical sciences project. || 
|-id=439
| 27439 Kamimura ||  || Jordan Roy Kamimura (born 1997) is a finalist in the 2011 Broadcom MASTERS, a math and science competition for middle-school students, for his animal and plant sciences project. || 
|-id=440
| 27440 Colekendrick ||  || Coleman J. Kendrick (born 1998) is a finalist in the 2011 Broadcom MASTERS, a math and science competition for middle-school students, for his physical sciences project. || 
|-id=445
| 27445 Lynnlane ||  || Lynn Lane (born 1955) has been the long-time business and finance manager of the University of Arizona's Lunar and Planetary Laboratory (LPL) and the Department of Planetary Sciences. She has served four LPL directors and provided invaluable support for numerous planetary scientists, students and spacecraft missions. || 
|-id=446
| 27446 Landoni ||  || Katherine Grace Landoni (born 1997) is a finalist in the 2011 Broadcom MASTERS, a math and science competition for middle-school students, for her animal and plant sciences project. || 
|-id=447
| 27447 Ichunlin ||  || I-Chun Florence Lin (born 1997) is a finalist in the 2011 Broadcom MASTERS, a math and science competition for middle-school students, for her physical sciences project. || 
|-id=449
| 27449 Jamarkley ||  || Jennifer Ann Markley (born 1998) is a finalist in the 2011 Broadcom MASTERS, a math and science competition for middle-school students, for her biochemistry, medicine, health science and microbiology project. || 
|-id=450
| 27450 Monzon ||  || Adriana S. Monzon (born 1999) is a finalist in the 2011 Broadcom MASTERS, a math and science competition for middle-school students, for her earth and space sciences project. || 
|-id=452
| 27452 Nikhilpatel ||  || Nikhil Sanjay Patel (born 1999) is a finalist in the 2011 Broadcom MASTERS, a math and science competition for middle-school students, for his environmental sciences project. || 
|-id=453
| 27453 Crystalpoole ||  || Crystal Rennae Poole (born 1996) is a finalist in the 2011 Broadcom MASTERS, a math and science competition for middle-school students, for her physical sciences project. || 
|-id=454
| 27454 Samapaige ||  || Samantha Paige Rowland (born 1997) is a finalist in the 2011 Broadcom MASTERS, a math and science competition for middle-school students, for her animal and plant sciences project. || 
|-id=456
| 27456 Sarkisian ||  || Emily Marie Sarkisian (born 1997) is a finalist in the 2011 Broadcom MASTERS, a math and science competition for middle-school students, for her earth and space sciences project. || 
|-id=457
| 27457 Tovinkere ||  || Mahita Gauri Tovinkere (born 1999) is a finalist in the 2011 Broadcom MASTERS, a math and science competition for middle-school students, for her earth and space sciences project. || 
|-id=458
| 27458 Williamwhite ||  || William Henry White (born 1997) is a finalist in the 2011 Broadcom MASTERS, a math and science competition for middle-school students, for his animal and plant sciences project. || 
|-id=465
| 27465 Cambroziak ||  || Carole Ambroziak, a mentor of a finalist in the 2011 Broadcom MASTERS, a math and science competition for middle-school students. || 
|-id=466
| 27466 Cargibaysal ||  || Cargi Baysal, a mentor of a finalist in the 2011 Broadcom MASTERS, a math and science competition for middle-school students. || 
|-id=470
| 27470 Debrabeckett ||  || Debra Beckett, a mentor of a finalist in the 2011 Broadcom MASTERS, a math and science competition for middle-school students. || 
|-id=478
| 27478 Kevinbloh ||  || Kevin M. Bloh, a mentor of a finalist in the 2011 Broadcom MASTERS, a math and science competition for middle-school students. || 
|-id=480
| 27480 Heablonsky ||  || Heather Blonsky, a mentor of a finalist in the 2011 Broadcom MASTERS, a math and science competition for middle-school students. || 
|-id=491
| 27491 Broksas ||  || Heidi Broksas, a mentor of a finalist in the 2011 Broadcom MASTERS, a math and science competition for middle-school students. || 
|-id=492
| 27492 Susanduncan ||  || Susan Duncan, a mentor of a finalist in the 2011 Broadcom MASTERS, a math and science competition for middle-school students. || 
|-id=493
| 27493 Derikesibill ||  || Derik Esibill, a mentor of a finalist in the 2011 Broadcom MASTERS, a math and science competition for middle-school students. || 
|-id=495
| 27495 Heatherfennell ||  || Heather Fennell mentored a finalist in the 2011 Broadcom MASTERS, a math and science competition for middle-school students. || 
|-id=500
| 27500 Mandelbrot ||  || Benoit Mandelbrot (1924–2010), was a Polish-born French and American mathematician and polymath. He studied geometric and physical structures, to which he gave the name fractals, that are self-similar at different scales. Fractal concepts have found application to many disciplines, from cardiology to the analysis of stock-market prices. || 
|}

27501–27600 

|-id=502
| 27502 Stephbecca ||  || Stephanie E. and Rebecca N. Wasserman, daughters of the discoverer || 
|-id=503
| 27503 Dankof ||  || Curtis Dankof (born 1994) is a Public Program Supervisor at Lowell Observatory and is responsible for the day-to-day operations of the public outreach programs. He also leverages the knowledge he gained as a certified interpretive guide to train the outreach team on effective interpretive methods. || 
|-id=504
| 27504 Denune ||  || Kimberley Denune (born 1990) is the Visitor Experience Supervisor for Lowell Observatory. She manages the Starry Skies Gift shop and ticketing desks. Kim is responsible for managing staff and visual merchandising. || 
|-id=505
| 27505 Catieblazek ||  || Catie Blazek (born 1988) is the HR/Payroll Supervisor for Lowell Observatory. She is instrumental in Lowell Observatory's wellness efforts, which were impactful during the COVID–19 pandemic. She is a guardian of our company culture and champions a diverse, equitable, friendly, collegial workplace. || 
|-id=506
| 27506 Glassmeier ||  || Karl-Heinz Glassmeier (born 1954) is an expert in magnetospheric and plasma physics and Lead Investigator of magnetometers on numerous planetary space missions. He found comet 67P/Churyumov-Gerasimenko to be emitting a 'song' in the form of oscillations in the magnetic field. || 
|-id=507
| 27507 Travisbrown ||  || Travis Brown (born 1989) is an Educator in Lowell Observatory's Native American Astronomy Outreach Program. He brings his enthusiasm and energy to partnerships with teachers to get kids excited about science. He enjoys introducing the students to rocketry and robots. || 
|-id=508
| 27508 Johncompton ||  || John Compton (born 1984), a staff member at the Lowell Observatory in Flagstaff, Arizona, who is responsible for creating schedules and specialty programs for visiting groups. || 
|-id=509
| 27509 Burcher ||  || Sarah Burcher (born 1990) is Outreach Manager at Lowell Observatory. She oversees the outreach team and the programs they deliver. She was a critical member of the team that commissioned the Giovale Open Deck Observatory and has significantly improved the quality of the live video observing program. || 
|-id=510
| 27510 Lisaactor ||  || Lisa Actor (born 1957) is the Deputy Director for Development at Lowell Observatory. She is in charge of all of Lowell's philanthropic activities. She and her team have successfully raised funds for Lowell's many research and outreach programs, as well as for its capital expansion projects. || 
|-id=511
| 27511 Emiliedunham ||  || Emilie T. Dunham (born 1992) completed her Ph.D. research at Arizona State University on the study of short-lived radionuclides present in meteorite samples to probe the solar system's galactic formation environment. || 
|-id=512
| 27512 Gilstrap ||  || Lisa Gilstrap, a mentor of a finalist in the 2011 Broadcom MASTERS, a math and science competition for middle-school students. || 
|-id=513
| 27513 Mishapipe ||  || Misha Pipe (born 1990) is an Educator in Lowell Observatory's Native American Astronomy Outreach Program. She uses her talent in relating to children in partnerships with teachers to get kids excited about science. She also designs hands-on activities and organizes summer and winter camps. || 
|-id=514
| 27514 Markov ||  || Andrei Andreevich Markov, Russian mathematician || 
|-id=515
| 27515 Gunnels ||  || Kim Gunnels, a mentor of a finalist in the 2011 Broadcom MASTERS, a math and science competition for middle-school students. || 
|-id=519
| 27519 Miames ||  || Michaela Iames, a mentor of a finalist in the 2011 Broadcom MASTERS, a math and science competition for middle-school students. || 
|-id=520
| 27520 Rounds ||  || Hannah Rounds (born 1987) is the Corporate and Foundation Relations Manager at Lowell Observatory. She acquires funding from organizations for astronomy research, educational activities, historic preservation, and capital projects. She previously served as a Development Assistant and as Grant Writer. || 
|-id=521
| 27521 Josschindler ||  || Jos Schindler (born 1989) is a Senior Public Program Educator at Lowell Observatory. In that role, they take the Observatory's guests on tours of the historic campus, operate telescopes for the public, and help engage children in science with Lowell Observatory's Camps for Kids. || 
|-id=522
| 27522 Lenkenyon ||  || Leonard Kenyon, a mentor of a finalist in the 2011 Broadcom MASTERS, a math and science competition for middle-school students. || 
|-id=524
| 27524 Clousing ||  || Wayne Clousing (born 1949) is a retired teacher, formerly of Watson Groen Christian School. He taught the 6th grade from 1974 to 2014, inspiring students to pursue interests in science, math and technology. || 
|-id=525
| 27525 Vartovka ||  || Vartovka, a hill near Banská Bystrica, Slovakia, on top of which a 16th-century watch tower was rebuilt as a public observatory in 1961 † ‡ || 
|-id=527
| 27527 Kirkkoehler ||  || Leonard Kenyon, a mentor of a finalist in the 2011 Broadcom MASTERS, a math and science competition for middle-school students. || 
|-id=529
| 27529 Rhiannonmayne ||  || Rhiannon Mayne (born 1980) is an associate professor at Texas Christian University and curator of the Monnig Meteorite Collection. Using laboratory and telescopic techniques, she has made important contributions towards understanding the process of planetary differentiation in the early Solar System. || 
|-id=530
| 27530 Daveshuck ||  || Dave Shuck (born 1971) is the Facilities, Grounds, and Maintenance Manager at Lowell Observatory. He supervises the facilities team, which is instrumental in keeping the campus maintained and looking its best. He plays a vital role in the Mars Hill campus expansion, including the Giovale Open Deck Observatory and the upcoming Astronomy Discovery Center. || 
|-id=531
| 27531 Sweaton ||  || Mike Sweaton (born 1957) is the Electrical Engineer for Lowell Observatory. He has ensured the continued successful operation of the Lowell Discovery Telescope (LDT). He has also made many performance improvements to the LDT and assisted with night time operations. || 
|-id=532
| 27532 Buchwald-Wright ||  || Charles von Buchwald-Wright (born 1986) is Lowell Observatory's IT Systems and Network Administrator. He maintains infrastructure for more than 100 staff, from scientists to engineers to educators. He also ensures smooth functioning of the computing resources required to operate the telescopes. || 
|-id=533
| 27533 Johnbrucato ||  || John Brucato (born 1968) is a senior scientist at the Astrobiology Laboratory at INAF Italy. He is an expert in laboratory studies related to asteroids and astrobiology, and simulating physical-chemical processes of organic molecules interacting with minerals found in planetary materials. || 
|-id=537
| 27537 Dianaweintraub ||  || Diana Weintraub (born 1978) is Lowell Observatory's Staff Accountant. She has intricate knowledge of policies that govern the Observatory's finances and is integral to ensuring fiduciary responsibility of our resources. She started by managing the gift shop and has advanced to the business office. || 
|-id=539
| 27539 Elmoutamid ||  || Maryame El Moutamid (born 1984) is a research associate at Cornell University (Ithaca, NY). Her studies include planetary rings and orbital dynamics. || 
|-id=540
| 27540 Kevinwhite ||  || Kevin White (born 1981) is Public Program Supervisor at Lowell Observatory. He is responsible for the day-to-day operations associated with the Observatory's public outreach programs. He also oversees volunteer training and leads regular constellations refreshers for the education staff and volunteers. || 
|-id=546
| 27546 Maryfran ||  || Maryfran McAuliffe, a mentor of a finalist in the 2011 Broadcom MASTERS, a math and science competition for middle-school students. || 
|-id=549
| 27549 Joannemichet ||  || Joanne Michet, a mentor of a finalist in the 2011 Broadcom MASTERS, a math and science competition for middle-school students. || 
|-id=551
| 27551 Pelayo ||  || Heather Pelayo, a mentor of a finalist in the 2011 Broadcom MASTERS, a math and science competition for middle-school students. || 
|-id=556
| 27556 Williamprem ||  || William Prem, a mentor of a finalist in the 2011 Broadcom MASTERS, a math and science competition for middle-school students. || 
|-id=563
| 27563 Staceychristen ||  || Stacey Christen (born 1968), a staff member at the Lowell Observatory in Flagstaff, Arizona, who works for the observatory's archives and museum, processing and cataloging manuscript collections and creating public exhibits. || 
|-id=564
| 27564 Astreichelt ||  || Astrid Reichelt, a mentor of a finalist in the 2011 Broadcom MASTERS, a math and science competition for middle-school students. || 
|-id=570
| 27570 Erinschumacher ||  || Erin Schumacher, a mentor of a finalist in the 2011 Broadcom MASTERS, a math and science competition for middle-school students. || 
|-id=571
| 27571 Bobscott ||  || Bob Scott, a mentor of a finalist in the 2011 Broadcom MASTERS, a math and science competition for middle-school students. || 
|-id=572
| 27572 Shurtleff ||  || Eileen Shurtleff, a mentor of a finalist in the 2011 Broadcom MASTERS, a math and science competition for middle-school students. || 
|-id=576
| 27576 Denisespirou ||  || Denise Spirou, a mentor of a finalist in the 2011 Broadcom MASTERS, a math and science competition for middle-school students. || 
|-id=578
| 27578 Yogisullivan ||  || Yogi Sullivan, a mentor of a finalist in the 2011 Broadcom MASTERS, a math and science competition for middle-school students. || 
|-id=580
| 27580 Angelataylor ||  || Angela Taylor, a mentor of a finalist in the 2011 Broadcom MASTERS, a math and science competition for middle-school students. || 
|-id=582
| 27582 Jackieterrel ||  || Jackie Terrel, a mentor of a finalist in the 2011 Broadcom MASTERS, a math and science competition for middle-school students. || 
|-id=584
| 27584 Barbaravelez ||  || Barbara Velez, a mentor of a finalist in the 2011 Broadcom MASTERS, a math and science competition for middle-school students. || 
|-id=588
| 27588 Wegley ||  || Peter Wegley, a mentor of a finalist in the 2011 Broadcom MASTERS, a math and science competition for middle-school students || 
|-id=589
| 27589 Paigegentry ||  || Paige Maree Gentry (born 1998) is a finalist in the 2012 Broadcom MASTERS, a math and science competition for middle-school students, for her animal and plant sciences project. || 
|-id=590
| 27590 Koarimatsu ||  || Ko Arimatsu (born 1987) is an astronomer at Kyoto University. He discovered a kilometer-sized Kuiper belt object by stellar occultation using a low-cost small telescope named the Organized Autotelescopes for Serendipitous Event Survey or OASES. || 
|-id=591
| 27591 Rugilmartin ||  || Raymond Ueki Gilmartin (born 1998) is a finalist in the 2012 Broadcom MASTERS, a math and science competition for middle-school students, for his physical sciences project. || 
|-id=593
| 27593 Oliviamarie ||  || Olivia Marie Henderson (born 1997) is a finalist in the 2012 Broadcom MASTERS, a math and science competition for middle-school students, for her earth and space sciences project. || 
|-id=595
| 27595 Hnath ||  || Sean Michael Hnath (born 1998) is a finalist in the 2012 Broadcom MASTERS, a math and science competition for middle-school students, for his environmental sciences project. || 
|-id=596
| 27596 Maldives || 2001 DH || Maldives, an island-country in the Pacific Ocean, the world's lowest-lying country. || 
|-id=597
| 27597 Varuniyer ||  || Varun V. Iyer (born 1998) is a finalist in the 2012 Broadcom MASTERS, a math and science competition for middle-school students, for his physical sciences project. || 
|}

27601–27700 

|-id=602
| 27602 Chaselewis ||  || Chase Douglas Lewis (born 1999) is a finalist in the 2012 Broadcom MASTERS, a math and science competition for middle-school students, for his physical sciences project. || 
|-id=606
| 27606 Davidli || 2001 KW || David X. Li (born 1998) is a finalist in the 2012 Broadcom MASTERS, a math and science competition for middle-school students, for his physical sciences project. || 
|-id=610
| 27610 Shixuanli ||  || Shixuan Justin Li (born 1998) is a finalist in the 2012 Broadcom MASTERS, a math and science competition for middle-school students, for his biochemistry, medicine, health science, and microbiology project. || 
|-id=613
| 27613 Annalou ||  || Anna J. Lou (born 2000) is a finalist in the 2012 Broadcom MASTERS, a math and science competition for middle-school students, for her mathematics and computer science project. || 
|-id=615
| 27615 Daniellu ||  || Daniel Lu (born 1998) is a finalist in the 2012 Broadcom MASTERS, a math and science competition for middle-school students, for his physical sciences project. || 
|-id=618
| 27618 Ceilierin ||  || Ceili Erin Masterson (born 1998) is a finalist in the 2012 Broadcom MASTERS, a math and science competition for middle-school students, for her animal and plant sciences project. || 
|-id=619
| 27619 Ethanmessier ||  || Ethan Wyatt Messier (born 2000) is a finalist in the 2012 Broadcom MASTERS, a math and science competition for middle-school students, for his physical sciences project. || 
|-id=657
| 27657 Berkhey || 1974 PC || Joannes Le Francq van Berkhey (1729–1812) was a famous Dutch physician, biologist and naturalist noted for his Natural History of Holland. He was considered an excellent poet for his time. The name was suggested by C. E. Koppeschaar || 
|-id=658
| 27658 Dmitrijbagalej || 1978 RV || Dmitrij Ivanovich Bagalej (1857–1932) was a historian, professor and rector of Kharkov University. His scientific works were devoted to the ancient history of Ukraine, Russia and Lithuania. During 1914–1917 he was head of the Kharkov town council || 
|-id=659
| 27659 Dolsky ||  || Alexandr Alexandrovich Dolsky (born 1938) is an Honoured Artist of Russia, a Bulat Okudzhava State literary prize-winner, a guitarist-virtuoso, a poet-musician and an author of many collections of poems and sonnets. || 
|-id=660
| 27660 Waterwayuni ||  || Saint-Petersburg State University of Waterway Communications (Санкт-Петербургский государственный университет водных коммуникаций), Russia || 
|-id=675
| 27675 Paulmaley || 1981 CH || Paul D. Maley (born 1947) is an amateur astronomer and an expert in occultation methods to define the shapes and sizes of asteroids. He has recorded nearly 300 separate asteroidal-occultation events spanning more than four decades. He has shown a lifelong passion for promoting the detection of asteroidal satellites by occultation. || 
|}

27701–27800 

|-id=706
| 27706 Strogen ||  || James A. Strogen (born 1947), American telescope operator (at the Mount Wilson Observatory), leader of the Los Angeles Astronomical Society, and who assisted in organizing the photographic glass plate archive of the 1.2-m Schmidt Oschin Telescope at Palomar Observatory || 
|-id=709
| 27709 Orenburg ||  || The Russian city of Orenburg (Оренбург), near the border to Kazakhstan || 
|-id=710
| 27710 Henseling ||  || Robert Henseling (1883–1964), German teacher and author of popular works on astronomy, editor of the annual Sternbüchlein, founder of the Stuttgart Volkssternwarte and of the journal Die Sterne || 
|-id=711
| 27711 Kirschvink ||  || Joseph Kirschvink (born 1953), American earth scientist ||  (Src)
|-id=712
| 27712 Coudray ||  || Clemens Wenzeslaus Coudray (1775–1845), German neoclassical architect || 
|-id=714
| 27714 Dochu || 1989 BR || Dochu in Awa is the soil column which was formed when a steep cliff eroded due to the wind and rain. This is a globally rare natural feature, unique in Japan, and was designated as a national monument of Japan. || 
|-id=716
| 27716 Nobuyuki ||  || Nobuyuki Yamaguchi (born 1932), Japanese meteorologist and astronomer || 
|-id=718
| 27718 Gouda ||  || Gouda, a city in the South Holland province of the Netherlands, was founded in 1272. || 
|-id=719
| 27719 Fast ||  || Wilhelm Fast (1936–2005), Russian mathematician, who directed a project to model the Tunguska event, and his daughter Annie, who assisted in subsequent projects || 
|-id=724
| 27724 Jeannoel ||  || Alexandre-Jean Noél (1752–1832), a French landscape and marine painter. || 
|-id=736
| 27736 Ekaterinburg ||  || The Russian city of Yekaterinburg (also known as Ekaterinburg, formerly Sverdlovsk) || 
|-id=739
| 27739 Kimihiro || 1990 UV || Kimihiro Matsugi (born 1955), Japanese elementary teacher and presenter at Geisei Observatory || 
|-id=740
| 27740 Obatomoyuki ||  || Tomoyuki Oba (born 1965), Japanese high school teacher and presenter at Geisei Observatory || 
|-id=748
| 27748 Vivianhoette || 1991 AL || Vivian Hoette, an American astronomy educator at the Yerkes Observatory for the Lawrence Hall of Science || 
|-id=758
| 27758 Michelson ||  || Albert A. Michelson (born 1852–1931), a German-born American physicist and Nobelist || 
|-id=764
| 27764 von Flüe ||  || Saint Nicholas of Flüe (1417–1487), Swiss councilor, judge, mystic, politician, and later hermit and patron saint of Switzerland || 
|-id=765
| 27765 Brockhaus ||  || Friedrich Arnold Brockhaus (1772–1823), German publisher, best known for its Brockhaus encyclopedia, which served as models for other reference books || 
|-id=775
| 27775 Lilialmanzor ||  || Lucette Destouches (1912–2019; née Lucie Almansor), a French dancer, who was married to the writer Louis-Ferdinand Céline for more than 30 years. || 
|-id=776
| 27776 Cortland ||  || State University of New York College at Cortland (Src) || 
|-id=789
| 27789 Astrakhan ||  || The Astrakhan Khanate, a Tatar feudal state established in the 15th century || 
|-id=790
| 27790 Urashimataro ||  || Urashima Tarō, a fictional character and the protagonist of a Japanese legend about a kind-hearted young fisherman. The story is loved by generations of children and many beaches across Japan are claimed to be the setting where the story took place. || 
|-id=791
| 27791 Masaru ||  || Masaru Kubota (born 1959), Japanese television broadcaster, weather forecaster, and science and astronomy popularizer || 
|-id=792
| 27792 Fridakahlo ||  || Frida Kahlo (1907–1954), a Mexican painter who is known for her portraits and self-portraits, as well as for paintings inspired by the nature and artifacts of Mexico. || 
|}

27801–27900 

|-id=810
| 27810 Daveturner ||  || David G. Turner, Canadian astronomer † || 
|-id=827
| 27827 Ukai ||  || A member of the Waseda Astronomical Association, he participated in the construction of an observatory hut in Nobeyama in 1970, camping out there for 30 consecutive days and becoming the first person to spend 100 nights in the hut || 
|-id=845
| 27845 Josephmeyer ||  || Joseph Meyer, 19th-century German merchant, publisher and publicist, founder of the Bibliographisches Institut at Gotha, which pioneered the subscription system of encyclopedia publishing || 
|-id=846
| 27846 Honegger ||  || Arthur Honegger, Swiss-French composer || 
|-id=849
| 27849 Suyumbika ||  || Suyumbika Tower, the symbol of Kazan, one of the oldest towns in Russia; legend has it that princess Suyumbika jumped from the tower rather than allow herself to be captured by enemies surrounding the town || 
|-id=855
| 27855 Giorgilli || 1995 AK || Antonio Giorgilli (born 1949), professor of mathematical physics at the University of Milan, distinguished himself in his productive career with numerous works in perturbation theory of Hamiltonian systems, with applications to studies of the long-term orbital stability of major and minor planets || 
|-id=864
| 27864 Antongraff ||  || Anton Graff, 18th-century Swiss portrait painter || 
|-id=865
| 27865 Ludgerfroebel || 1995 FQ || Ludger Froebel (born 1958) has been the leader of several space projects and the manager of the "Space Transport and Space Technology" program at the German Aerospace Center (DLR). He initiated the DLR Compact Satellite Program, including the AsteroidFinder mission that will be searching for inner-earth objects || 
|-id=870
| 27870 Jillwatson || 1995 VW || Jill Watson, American graduate of the U.S. Air Force Academy, first assigned to AMOS (the discovery site) on Maui || 
|-id=879
| 27879 Shibata ||  || Shinpei Shibata, Japanese astrophysicist || 
|-id=895
| 27895 Yeduzheng || 1996 LL || Ye Du-zheng (born 1916), a Meteorologist || 
|-id=896
| 27896 Tourminator || 1996 NB || Peter Sagan (born 1990) is a Slovak road cyclist. One of his nicknames is the Tourminator due to several stage wins and good placing in the points classification of top races. He was a winner of the Green jersey in the Tour de France in 2012, 2013 and 2014. || 
|-id=899
| 27899 Letterman || 1996 QF || David M. Letterman (born 1947), a seven-time Emmy-winning American comedian, actor and producer. || 
|-id=900
| 27900 Cecconi || 1996 RM || Massimo Cecconi (born 1965) has worked on the GAIA mission and for the International Space Station. || 
|}

27901–28000 

|-id=915
| 27915 Nancywright ||  || Nancy Wright, friend of the discoverer || 
|-id=917
| 27917 Edoardo ||  || Edoardo Tesi, grandson of Luciano Tesi † || 
|-id=918
| 27918 Azusagawa ||  || Azusagawa, a 65-km-long river which flows from the Hida mountain range, the so-called Northern Alps, through Matumoto city, Nagano prefecture, Japan. || 
|-id=922
| 27922 Mascheroni ||  || Lorenzo Mascheroni, Italian mathematician || 
|-id=923
| 27923 Dimitribartolini ||  || Dimitri Bartolini (born 2015) is the grandson of the first discoverer. || 
|-id=928
| 27928 Nithintumma ||  || Nithin Reddy Tumma (born 1994) is a finalist in the 2012 Intel Science Talent Search, and was awarded first place in the 2011 Intel International Science and Engineering Fair, for his biochemistry project. || 
|-id=930
| 27930 Nakamatsu ||  || Kathy Nakamatsu mentored a finalist in the 2012 Intel Science Talent Search, a science competition for high-school seniors. || 
|-id=931
| 27931 Zeitlin-Trinkle ||  || Maria Zeitlin-Trinkle mentored a finalist in the 2012 Intel Science Talent Search, a science competition for high-school seniors. || 
|-id=932
| 27932 Leonyao ||  || Leon Yao (born 1994) is a finalist in the 2012 Intel Science Talent Search, a science competition for high-school seniors, for his engineering project. || 
|-id=938
| 27938 Guislain ||  || Joseph Guislain (1797–1860), one of the first students at the University of Ghent, was appointed head of the psychiatric hospitals in Ghent in 1820. He is remembered for proposing a law that formed the basis of psychiatric treatment in Belgium for more than a century || 
|-id=947
| 27947 Emilemathieu ||  || Émile Léonard Mathieu, French mathematician || 
|-id=949
| 27949 Jonasz ||  || Michel Jonasz, French poet and singer || 
|-id=952
| 27952 Atapuerca ||  || Atapuerca, small Spanish mountain chain in the province of Burgos, a UNESCO World Heritage site because of the human fossil deposits discovered there || 
|-id=955
| 27955 Yasumasa ||  || Yasumasa Watanabe (born 1946), a member of the Yamagata Astronomical Society in 1986. || 
|-id=958
| 27958 Giussano ||  || Giussano, an Italian town in the heart of Brianza, is famous for its furniture design companies. Among the town's historical monuments and villas is the Villa Sartirana, recently renovated. Home to the local library, this villa hosts in its decorated halls cultural events, including some aimed at astronomical popularization || 
|-id=959
| 27959 Fagioli ||  || Giancarlo Fagioli, Italian cartographer and amateur astronomer † || 
|-id=960
| 27960 Dobiáš ||  || Václav Dobiáš (1909–1978), Czech composer, organizer of musical life and pedagogue, educated a number of composers, including the discoverer's father. His cycle of songs Praho jediná ("Prague, the Only One") is a beautiful apotheosis of the Czech city || 
|-id=961
| 27961 Kostelecký ||  || Jan Kostelecký (born 1946) is a professor at the Faculty of Civil Engineering of the Czech Technical University in Prague. He deals with geodetic astronomy, space geodesy and geodynamics. He also served as the supervisor of both the master's and doctoral theses of the discoverer. || 
|-id=963
| 27963 Hartkopf ||  || US astronomer William I. Hartkopf (born 1951), president of IAU Commission 26 (Double and Multiple Stars) from 2003 to 2006, made important contributions to double-star orbit determinations and speckle interferometric observations. In 2009 he was awarded the Simon Newcomb award of the U.S. Naval Observatory. || 
|-id=966
| 27966 Changguang ||  || Changguang stands for the Changchun Institute of Optics, Fine Mechanics and Physics of the Chinese Academy of Sciences. || 
|-id=967
| 27967 Beppebianchi || 1997 TE || Giuseppe Bianchi (1791–1866) founded the astronomical observatory at Modena in 1827 and served as its director until 1859. Observing with the Reichenbach meridian circle he made a catalogue of 220 fundamental stars as a revision of Piazzi's work. This allowed him to discover the variability of some of the proper motions || 
|-id=968
| 27968 Bobylapointe ||  || Boby Lapointe, French singer and mathematician. || 
|-id=974
| 27974 Drejsl || 1997 UH || Radim Drejsl, Czech composer † || 
|-id=975
| 27975 Mazurkiewicz ||  || Stefan Mazurkiewicz, Polish mathematician || 
|-id=977
| 27977 Distratis ||  || Cosimo Distratis, Italian supporter of the amateur observatory at Montefusco Uggiano in Italy † || 
|-id=978
| 27978 Lubosluka ||  || Luboš Sluka, Czech composer † || 
|-id=982
| 27982 Atsushimiyazaki ||  || Atsushi Miyazaki (1970–2011), a staff member of Association for Aid and Relief, Japan, died while engaging in relief activities to support the survivors of the 2011 Van earthquake. || 
|-id=983
| 27983 Bernardi ||  || Fabrizio Bernardi, Italian astronomer || 
|-id=984
| 27984 Herminefranz || 1997 VN || Hermine and Franz Stoss, parents of the discoverer, Banat-born German amateur astronomer Rainer Michael Stoss † || 
|-id=985
| 27985 Remanzacco ||  || Remanzacco, Italy, location of the Osservatorio di Remanzacco, an amateur observatory || 
|-id=986
| 27986 Hanuš ||  || Jan Hanuš, Czech composer † || 
|-id=988
| 27988 Menabrea ||  || Luigi Federico Menabrea, Italian (Piedmontese) mathematician and statesman || 
|-id=991
| 27991 Koheijimiura ||  || Koheiji Miura (1933–2006), an internationally known Japanese ceramic artist. || 
|-id=997
| 27997 Bandos ||  || Bandos, a small island located in the North Male Atoll in the Republic of Maldives. || 
|}

References 

027001-028000